Ljubovo is a village in the municipality of Trebinje, Republika Srpska, Bosnia and Herzegovina.

Notable people
Mićo Ljubibratić

References

Villages in Republika Srpska
Populated places in Trebinje